Allendale County Courthouse is a historic county courthouse in Allendale, Allendale County, South Carolina. It was added to the National Register of Historic Places in 2007.

Description and history
It was built in 1921–1922, and is a two-story yellow brick and limestone-accented building with a central block with pedestaled pediment dominated by a monumental, unengaged, flat-roofed Neoclassical Revival portico. The portico features four massive limestone columns and responding pilasters of the Tuscan order, a classical entablature, and a brick-and-limestone parapet.

Immediately to the rear and connected to the historic courthouse by a narrow two-story hyphen is a large office and courtroom building that was completed and occupied in 2004. The interior was restored after a devastating arson fire on the morning of May 18, 1998.

References

External links
 

County courthouses in South Carolina
Courthouses on the National Register of Historic Places in South Carolina
Neoclassical architecture in South Carolina
Government buildings completed in 1922
Buildings and structures in Allendale County, South Carolina
National Register of Historic Places in Allendale County, South Carolina